Schinia aetheria is a moth of the family Noctuidae first described by William Barnes and James Halliday McDunnough in 1912. It is found in North America, including Arizona, Nevada, New Mexico and Utah.

It was formerly considered a subspecies of Schinia sueta.

The wingspan is 24–25 mm.

External links

Butterflies and Moths of North America

Schinia
Moths of North America
Moths described in 1912